Queen of the Netherlands is a Dutch Trailing suction hopper dredger ship constructed in 1998. After lengthening in 2009, she was the largest and most powerful dredger in the world. The vessel has been used in high-profile salvage and dredging operations including the investigation into the Swissair Flight 111 crash and in the Port Phillip Channel Deepening Project. It has been called "the world's largest floating vacuum cleaner".

Capability 
The ship has three hopper discharge options of pumping ashore by pipeline, dumping through bottom doors or rainbowing. The ship has equipment to dredge almost any material; such as clay, silt, sand and rock. During the Swissair Flight 111 salvage operation, a mixture of sea water, silt and aircraft pieces was pumped out of the Atlantic Ocean. The pump room onboard has two  dredge engines that can be used in series or in parallel with the vessels two  suction pipes or combined with a submerged outboard pump. The vessel also has three  jet water pumps that are used to agitate subsea material whilst trailing, collapse and liquify hopper cargo for pumping or degassing natural air pockets in the seabed using the Venturi effect.

Projects 
Queen of the Netherlands has worked on various projects in Singapore, Daya Bay in China, port construction in Busan South Korea, Dubai, the Port Phillip Channel Deepening Project in Australia and island creation / land reclamation The Maldives. She has a sister ship called Fairway, which, like Queen of the Netherlands was also lengthened for land reclamation projects in the Far East. The ship has caused controversy in Australia, sparking protests.

References

External links
Official Fact Sheet
Bert Visser's Directory of Dredgers

Dredgers
Ships of the Netherlands
1998 ships